James Hayward is an Australian politician. He has been a member of the Western Australian Legislative Council since 2021, and was a member of the National Party of Australia (WA) from 2012 until 3 December 2021, when he resigned after being charged with child sex offences.

Personal life
Hayward was born in Derby, Western Australia. He attended Riverton Primary School and Willetton Senior High School in Perth.

He married in October 2002. He has three sons and three daughters.

Career
He worked as a television journalist in the Pilbara region of Western Australia for GWN7, and for Channel 7 Perth. He joined the National Party of Australia (WA) in 2012.

In 2013, he was elected to Bunbury City Council, serving until 2021. He served as state president of the National Party from 2015 to 2019, and as the federal vice president of the National Party of Australia. At the 2021 Western Australian state election, Hayward was elected to the Western Australian Legislative Council as a member for South West.

He was the shadow minister for Local Government, Water, and Regional Cities.

On 2 December 2021, Western Australia Police charged Hayward with alleged child sexual abuse of an eight-year-old girl earlier in 2021. He was charged with three counts of indecent dealings with a child under 13 years, one count of procuring a child under 13 years to do an indecent act and one count of persistent sexual conduct. Later the same day, he was suspended by the National Party of Australia(WA). The following day, he resigned from the party. In February 2022, Hayward revealed he will not resign from parliament, saying that if he resigned, "it would send a message that any person in public office can be removed by simply making an untested allegation." In June 2022, prosecutors dropped the charge of persistent sexual conduct. He pleaded not guilty to the four remaining charges, and will stand trial starting in August 2023.

References 

Living people
Members of the Western Australian Legislative Council
National Party of Australia members of the Parliament of Western Australia
21st-century Australian politicians
Year of birth missing (living people)
Western Australian local councillors